The Vienna Highflyer is a breed of fancy pigeon developed over many years of selective breeding. Vienna Highflyers, along with other varieties of domesticated pigeons, are all descendants from the rock pigeon (Columba livia).

See also 
List of pigeon breeds

References

Pigeon breeds